Mohamad Hassan may refer to

Muhammad Hassan (wrestler), wrestler
Mohamad Hasan (politician), former Menteri Besar of Negeri Sembilan